The Philadelphia Phillies are a Major League Baseball team based in Philadelphia in the United States of America. Below are details about their 1984 season.

Offseason 
 October 19, 1983: Pete Rose was released by the Phillies.
 December 3, 1983: Ron Reed was traded by the Phillies to the Chicago White Sox for a player to be named later. The White Sox completed the deal by sending Jerry Koosman to the Phillies on February 15, 1984.
 December 6, 1983: Tony Pérez was purchased from the Phillies by the Cincinnati Reds.
 January 30, 1984: Butch Benton was signed as a free agent by the Phillies.
 March 24, 1984: Willie Hernández and Dave Bergman were traded by the Phillies to the Detroit Tigers for John Wockenfuss and Glenn Wilson.

Spring training 
The Phils went 13-16 in spring training exhibition play. The Phillies closed spring training with two games against the St. Louis Cardinals at the Louisiana Superdome on March 31, 1984, and April 1, 1984.

Regular season

Season standings

Record vs. opponents

Notable transactions 
 April 20, 1984: Butch Benton was released by the Phillies.
 June 2, 1984: Dave Wehrmeister was signed as a free agent by the Phillies.
 June 3, 1984: Jim Kern was signed as a free agent by the Phillies.
 July 27, 1984: Jim Kern was released by the Phillies.
 August 20, 1984: Kelly Downs and George Riley were traded by the Phillies to the San Francisco Giants for Al Oliver and a player to be named later. The Giants completed the deal by sending Renie Martin to the Phillies on August 30.

Draft picks 
 June 4, 1984: 1984 Major League Baseball draft
Marvin Freeman was drafted by the Phillies in the 2nd round. Player signed June 14, 1984.
Todd Frohwirth was drafted by the Phillies in the 13th round. Player signed June 9, 1984.
Keith Miller was drafted by the Phillies in the 16th round.

Game log

|- style="background:#bfb"
| 1 || April 3 || @ Braves || 5–0 || Steve Carlton (1–0) || Len Barker (0–1) || None || 34,331 || 1–0
|- style="background:#fbb"
| 2 || April 4 || @ Braves || 0–4 || Craig McMurtry (1–0) || John Denny (0–1) || Steve Bedrosian (1) || 11,152 || 1–1
|- style="background:#bfb"
| 3 || April 6 || @ Reds || 8–4 || Charles Hudson (1–0) || Joe Price (0–1) || None || 12,236 || 2–1
|- style="background:#bfb"
| 4 || April 7 || @ Reds || 9–1 || Jerry Koosman (1–0) || Frank Pastore (0–1) || None || 12,516 || 3–1
|- style="background:#fbb"
| 5 || April 8 || @ Reds || 7–8 (11) || Mike Smith (1–0) || Larry Andersen (0–1) || None || 16,443 || 3–2
|- style="background:#bfb"
| 6 || April 10 || Astros || 3–1 || John Denny (1–1) || Nolan Ryan (1–1) || Al Holland (1) || 37,236 || 4–2
|- style="background:#bfb"
| 7 || April 11 || Astros || 7–6 || Bill Campbell (1–0) || Bill Dawley (0–1) || None || 20,108 || 5–2
|- style="background:#fbb"
| 8 || April 13 || @ Expos || 1–5 || Charlie Lea (2–1) || Jerry Koosman (1–1) || Gary Lucas (2) || 48,060 || 5–3
|- style="background:#bfb"
| 9 || April 14 || @ Expos || 4–3 || Larry Andersen (1–1) || Dan Schatzeder (0–1) || Al Holland (2) || 17,030 || 6–3
|- style="background:#bbb"
| – || April 15 || @ Expos || colspan=6 | Postponed (rain); Makeup: August 7 as a traditional double-header
|- style="background:#bbb"
| – || April 16 || @ Pirates || colspan=6 | Postponed (rain); Makeup: June 22 as a traditional double-header
|- style="background:#bfb"
| 10 || April 17 || @ Pirates || 4–1 || Charles Hudson (2–0) || John Tudor (1–1) || Al Holland (3) || 34,114 || 7–3
|- style="background:#fbb"
| 11 || April 18 || @ Pirates || 3–6 || John Candelaria (2–1) || Jerry Koosman (1–2) || Don Robinson (2) || 2,752 || 7–4
|- style="background:#fbb"
| 12 || April 20 || Mets || 1–3 (10) || Doug Sisk (1–0) || Al Holland (0–1) || Jesse Orosco (3) || 24,096 || 7–5
|- style="background:#bfb"
| 13 || April 21 || Mets || 12–2 || John Denny (2–1) || Mike Torrez (0–2) || None || 27,114 || 8–5
|- style="background:#bfb"
| 14 || April 22 || Mets || 12–5 || Charles Hudson (3–0) || Ron Darling (1–2) || None || 20,348 || 9–5
|- style="background:#bbb"
| – || April 23 || Pirates || colspan=6 | Postponed (rain); Makeup: June 8 as a traditional double-header
|- style="background:#fbb"
| 15 || April 24 || Pirates || 2–3 || John Candelaria (3–1) || Jerry Koosman (1–3) || Kent Tekulve (1) || 14,096 || 9–6
|- style="background:#bfb"
| 16 || April 25 || Pirates || 8–7 || Tug McGraw (1–0) || Lee Tunnell (0–1) || Al Holland (4) || 20,622 || 10–6
|- style="background:#bfb"
| 17 || April 27 || @ Mets || 8–3 || Bill Campbell (2–0) || Doug Sisk (1–1) || None || 18,171 || 11–6
|- style="background:#fbb"
| 18 || April 28 || @ Mets || 3–4 || Ed Lynch (2–0) || Al Holland (0–2) || None || 14,292 || 11–7
|- style="background:#fbb"
| 19 || April 29 || @ Mets || 2–6 || Walt Terrell (3–1) || Jerry Koosman (1–4) || Jesse Orosco (4) || 28,562 || 11–8
|- style="background:#fbb"
| 20 || April 30 || Expos || 2–5 || Andy McGaffigan (1–0) || Steve Carlton (1–1) || None || 20,277 || 11–9
|-

|- style="background:#bfb"
| 21 || May 1 || Expos || 7–4 || Kevin Gross (1–0) || Bob James (0–2) || Al Holland (5) || 20,118 || 12–9
|- style="background:#fbb"
| 22 || May 2 || Expos || 2–3 || Bob James (1–2) || John Denny (2–2) || Gary Lucas (4) || 24,922 || 12–10
|- style="background:#fbb"
| 23 || May 4 || Reds || 5–9 || Frank Pastore (1–2) || Charles Hudson (3–1) || None || 25,180 || 12–11
|- style="background:#bfb"
| 24 || May 5 || Reds || 11–2 || Jerry Koosman (2–4) || Bruce Berenyi (1–4) || None || 30,073 || 13–11
|- style="background:#fbb"
| 25 || May 6 || Reds || 3–5 || John Franco (2–0) || Steve Carlton (1–2) || Tom Hume (3) || 34,842 || 13–12
|- style="background:#fbb"
| 26 || May 7 || Braves || 6–8 || Pascual Pérez (1–0) || Marty Bystrom (0–1) || Gene Garber (2) || 17,739 || 13–13
|- style="background:#fbb"
| 27 || May 8 || Braves || 2–8 || Pete Falcone (2–3) || John Denny (2–3) || None || 13,443 || 13–14
|- style="background:#fbb"
| 28 || May 9 || @ Astros || 1–7 || Bob Knepper (3–4) || Charles Hudson (3–2) || None || 9,824 || 13–15
|- style="background:#fbb"
| 29 || May 10 || @ Astros || 2–4 || Mike Scott (2–1) || Jerry Koosman (2–5) || Frank DiPino (4) || 11,492 || 13–16
|- style="background:#bfb"
| 30 || May 11 || @ Padres || 6–4 || Al Holland (1–2) || Dave Dravecky (1–2) || None || 18,009 || 14–16
|- style="background:#bfb"
| 31 || May 12 || @ Padres || 3–2 || Bill Campbell (3–0) || Andy Hawkins (3–1) || Al Holland (6) || 36,916 || 15–16
|- style="background:#bfb"
| 32 || May 13 || @ Padres || 8–3 || John Denny (3–3) || Ed Whitson (2–3) || None || 38,645 || 16–16
|- style="background:#bfb"
| 33 || May 14 || @ Dodgers || 3–2 || Charles Hudson (4–2) || Jerry Reuss (2–2) || Al Holland (7) || 39,577 || 17–16
|- style="background:#bfb"
| 34 || May 15 || @ Dodgers || 12–1 || Jerry Koosman (3–5) || Bob Welch (3–4) || None || 41,620 || 18–16
|- style="background:#bfb"
| 35 || May 16 || @ Dodgers || 7–2 || Steve Carlton (2–2) || Fernando Valenzuela (3–5) || None || 48,938 || 19–16
|- style="background:#bfb"
| 36 || May 18 || @ Giants || 1–0 || Marty Bystrom (1–1) || Mike Krukow (2–5) || Al Holland (8) || 12,641 || 20–16
|- style="background:#bfb"
| 37 || May 19 || @ Giants || 6–2 || John Denny (4–3) || Renie Martin (1–1) || Al Holland (9) || 15,124 || 21–16
|- style="background:#bfb"
| 38 || May 20 || @ Giants || 7–4 || Charles Hudson (5–2) || Jeff Robinson (3–5) || Larry Andersen (1) || 23,797 || 22–16
|- style="background:#bfb"
| 39 || May 22 || Dodgers || 3–1 || Jerry Koosman (4–5) || Bob Welch (3–5) || Al Holland (10) || 30,190 || 23–16
|- style="background:#fbb"
| 40 || May 23 || Dodgers || 0–1 || Fernando Valenzuela (4–5) || Steve Carlton (2–3) || None || 22,864 || 23–17
|- style="background:#bfb"
| 41 || May 24 || Dodgers || 4–3 || Al Holland (2–2) || Pat Zachry (2–1) || None || 26,163 || 24–17
|- style="background:#fbb"
| 42 || May 25 || Padres || 3–7 || Ed Whitson (4–3) || Charles Hudson (5–3) || None || 25,964 || 24–18
|- style="background:#bfb"
| 43 || May 26 || Padres || 7–2 || Marty Bystrom (2–1) || Mark Thurmond (3–3) || None || 32,898 || 25–18
|- style="background:#fbb"
| 44 || May 27 || Padres || 0–4 || Tim Lollar (3–4) || Jerry Koosman (4–6) || Craig Lefferts (2) || 34,352 || 25–19
|- style="background:#bbb"
| – || May 29 || Giants || colspan=6 | Postponed (rain); Makeup: August 30 as a traditional double-header
|- style="background:#bfb"
| 45 || May 30 || Giants || 3–2 || Al Holland (3–2) || Greg Minton (1–4) || None || 13,524 || 26–19
|- style="background:#bfb"
| 46 || May 31 || Cubs || 10–2 || Charles Hudson (6–3) || Chuck Rainey (3–4) || None || 25,044 || 27–19
|-

|- style="background:#fbb"
| 47 || June 1 || Cubs || 3–12 || Rick Reuschel (3–1) || Marty Bystrom (2–2) || None || 30,076 || 27–20
|- style="background:#bfb"
| 48 || June 2 || Cubs || 3–2 || Al Holland (4–2) || Lee Smith (3–3) || None || 40,102 || 28–20
|- style="background:#fbb"
| 49 || June 3 || Cubs || 2–11 || Steve Trout (7–3) || Kevin Gross (1–1) || Warren Brusstar (2) || 30,278 || 28–21
|- style="background:#fbb"
| 50 || June 4 || @ Cardinals || 3–4 (11) || Bruce Sutter (2–3) || Al Holland (4–3) || None || 27,131 || 28–22
|- style="background:#fbb"
| 51 || June 5 || @ Cardinals || 3–5 || Joaquín Andújar (10–4) || Charles Hudson (6–4) || Bruce Sutter (13) || 23,921 || 28–23
|- style="background:#fbb"
| 52 || June 6 || @ Cardinals || 3–4 || Neil Allen (3–1) || Bill Campbell (3–1) || None || 24,025 || 28–24
|- style="background:#bfb"
| 53 || June 8 (1) || Pirates || 5–4 || Jerry Koosman (5–6) || John Candelaria (5–5) || Al Holland (11) || see 2nd game || 29–24
|- style="background:#bfb"
| 54 || June 8 (2) || Pirates || 2–1 || Kevin Gross (2–1) || Larry McWilliams (2–4) || Al Holland (12) || 31,133 || 30–24
|- style="background:#bfb"
| 55 || June 9 || Pirates || 6–5 || Steve Carlton (3–3) || John Tudor (4–3) || Al Holland (13) || 31,981 || 31–24
|- style="background:#fbb"
| 56 || June 10 || Pirates || 6–12 (12) || Cecilio Guante (2–2) || Jim Kern (0–1) || None || 32,996 || 31–25
|- style="background:#fbb"
| 57 || June 11 || Cardinals || 4–6 || Danny Cox (3–7) || Marty Bystrom (2–3) || Bruce Sutter (15) || 20,844 || 31–26
|- style="background:#fbb"
| 58 || June 12 || Cardinals || 2–7 || Ricky Horton (2–0) || Kevin Gross (2–2) || Neil Allen (3) || 22,265 || 31–27
|- style="background:#bfb"
| 59 || June 13 || Cardinals || 4–1 || Jerry Koosman (6–6) || Dave LaPoint (6–7) || None || 22,212 || 32–27
|- style="background:#bfb"
| 60 || June 14 || @ Cubs || 11–2 || Steve Carlton (4–3) || Rich Bordi (2–1) || None || 23,373 || 33–27
|- style="background:#bfb"
| 61 || June 15 || @ Cubs || 5–2 || Charles Hudson (7–4) || Chuck Rainey (5–5) || Al Holland (14) || 27,489 || 34–27
|- style="background:#bfb"
| 62 || June 16 || @ Cubs || 8–2 || Marty Bystrom (3–3) || Rick Reuschel (3–3) || None || 40,723 || 35–27
|- style="background:#bfb"
| 63 || June 17 || @ Cubs || 9–7 || Kevin Gross (3–2) || Dennis Eckersley (5–7) || Al Holland (15) || 36,882 || 36–27
|- style="background:#bfb"
| 64 || June 19 || @ Mets || 6–4 || Jerry Koosman (7–6) || Ed Lynch (7–2) || None || 28,061 || 37–27
|- style="background:#fbb"
| 65 || June 20 || @ Mets || 4–7 || Ron Darling (7–3) || Steve Carlton (4–4) || Doug Sisk (8) || 28,082 || 37–28
|- style="background:#fbb"
| 66 || June 21 || @ Mets || 7–10 || Jesse Orosco (5–2) || Bill Campbell (3–2) || Doug Sisk (9) || 20,094 || 37–29
|- style="background:#fbb"
| 67 || June 22 (1) || @ Pirates || 3–10 || Larry McWilliams (4–5) || Marty Bystrom (3–4) || None || see 2nd game || 37–30
|- style="background:#fbb"
| 68 || June 22 (2) || @ Pirates || 6–7 (13) || Rod Scurry (1–3) || Bill Campbell (3–3) || None || 20,516 || 37–31
|- style="background:#bfb"
| 69 || June 23 || @ Pirates || 7–5 || Jerry Koosman (8–6) || John Candelaria (5–6) || None || 19,014 || 38–31
|- style="background:#bfb"
| 70 || June 24 || @ Pirates || 4–2 || Steve Carlton (5–4) || John Tudor (4–5) || Al Holland (16) || 17,749 || 39–31
|- style="background:#fbb"
| 71 || June 25 || Mets || 5–10 || Ron Darling (8–3) || Charles Hudson (7–5) || None || 26,090 || 39–32
|- style="background:#bfb"
| 72 || June 26 || Mets || 3–0 || Kevin Gross (4–2) || Walt Terrell (5–7) || Al Holland (17) || 28,347 || 40–32
|- style="background:#bfb"
| 73 || June 27 || Mets || 5–1 || Marty Bystrom (4–4) || Dwight Gooden (6–5) || Larry Andersen (2) || 35,151 || 41–32
|- style="background:#fbb"
| 74 || June 28 || Astros || 6–7 || Bill Dawley (5–4) || Al Holland (4–4) || None || 25,742 || 41–33
|- style="background:#bfb"
| 75 || June 29 || Astros || 7–2 || Steve Carlton (6–4) || Bob Knepper (7–8) || None || 25,056 || 42–33
|- style="background:#fbb"
| 76 || June 30 || Astros || 0–7 || Mike LaCoss (3–0) || Charles Hudson (7–6) || Dave Smith (3) || 23,483 || 42–34
|-

|- style="background:#fbb"
| 77 || July 1 || Astros || 1–13 || Joe Niekro (8–7) || Kevin Gross (4–3) || None || 24,737 || 42–35
|- style="background:#bfb"
| 78 || July 2 || Reds || 4–0 || Shane Rawley (3–3) || Tom Hume (3–8) || None || 21,381 || 43–35
|- style="background:#fbb"
| 79 || July 3 || Reds || 5–6 || Charlie Puleo (1–1) || Jerry Koosman (8–7) || None || 63,816 || 43–36
|- style="background:#fbb"
| 80 || July 4 || Reds || 4–5 (10) || Ted Power (5–4) || Al Holland (4–5) || None || 20,785 || 43–37
|- style="background:#bfb"
| 81 || July 5 || Braves || 1–0 (7) || Charles Hudson (8–6) || Rick Mahler (6–4) || None || 21,393 || 44–37
|- style="background:#fbb"
| 82 || July 6 || Braves || 0–5 || Pascual Pérez (9–3) || Kevin Gross (4–4) || None || 22,393 || 44–38
|- style="background:#fbb"
| 83 || July 7 || Braves || 2–5 || Rick Camp (4–1) || Shane Rawley (3–4) || Donnie Moore (9) || 27,141 || 44–39
|- style="background:#bfb"
| 84 || July 8 || Braves || 7–0 || Jerry Koosman (9–7) || Craig McMurtry (7–9) || None || 38,070 || 45–39
|- style="background:#bbcaff;"
| – || July 10 ||colspan="7" |1984 Major League Baseball All-Star Game at Candlestick Park in San Francisco
|- style="background:#bfb"
| 85 || July 12 || @ Astros || 5–3 || Steve Carlton (7–4) || Joe Niekro (9–8) || Al Holland (18) || 17,036 || 46–39
|- style="background:#bfb"
| 86 || July 13 || @ Astros || 7–3 || Shane Rawley (4–4) || Nolan Ryan (7–5) || Larry Andersen (3) || 23,758 || 47–39
|- style="background:#bfb"
| 87 || July 14 || @ Astros || 4–3 || Jerry Koosman (10–7) || Vern Ruhle (1–7) || Al Holland (19) || 29,211 || 48–39
|- style="background:#fbb"
| 88 || July 15 || @ Astros || 2–3 (16) || Frank DiPino (3–5) || Don Carman (0–1) || None || 15,276 || 48–40
|- style="background:#bfb"
| 89 || July 16 || @ Reds || 7–2 || Kevin Gross (5–4) || Tom Hume (3–9) || None || 15,460 || 49–40
|- style="background:#bfb"
| 90 || July 17 || @ Reds || 4–3 || Steve Carlton (8–4) || Joe Price (3–7) || Al Holland (20) || 14,083 || 50–40
|- style="background:#bfb"
| 91 || July 18 || @ Reds || 7–5 || Shane Rawley (5–4) || Jeff Russell (4–11) || Al Holland (21) || 13,539 || 51–40
|- style="background:#bfb"
| 92 || July 19 || @ Braves || 9–1 || Jerry Koosman (11–7) || Craig McMurtry (7–11) || None || 20,227 || 52–40
|- style="background:#fbb"
| 93 || July 20 || @ Braves || 1–13 || Len Barker (7–7) || Charles Hudson (8–7) || None || 29,162 || 52–41
|- style="background:#fbb"
| 94 || July 21 || @ Braves || 3–5 || Rick Camp (5–2) || Kevin Gross (5–5) || Donnie Moore (10) || 34,890 || 52–42
|- style="background:#bfb"
| 95 || July 22 || @ Braves || 6–2 || Steve Carlton (9–4) || Rick Mahler (6–6) || None || 26,334 || 53–42
|- style="background:#fbb"
| 96 || July 23 || Cubs || 2–3 || Rick Sutcliffe (11–6) || Shane Rawley (5–5) || Lee Smith (21) || 32,243 || 53–43
|- style="background:#bfb"
| 97 || July 24 || Cubs || 3–2 || Jerry Koosman (12–7) || Tim Stoddard (7–2) || Al Holland (22) || 37,063 || 54–43
|- style="background:#fbb"
| 98 || July 25 || Cubs || 4–9 || Dennis Eckersley (8–10) || Charles Hudson (8–8) || None || 45,183 || 54–44
|- style="background:#fbb"
| 99 || July 27 || Expos || 1–6 || David Palmer (5–3) || Steve Carlton (9–5) || Bob James (7) || 30,222 || 54–45
|- style="background:#fbb"
| 100 || July 28 || Expos || 1–4 || Bryn Smith (9–8) || Shane Rawley (5–6) || None || 34,303 || 54–46
|- style="background:#bfb"
| 101 || July 29 || Expos || 6–4 || Kevin Gross (6–5) || Jeff Reardon (3–4) || None || 40,965 || 55–46
|- style="background:#fbb"
| 102 || July 30 || @ Cubs || 2–3 || Dennis Eckersley (9–10) || Charles Hudson (8–9) || Lee Smith (22) || 29,425 || 55–47
|- style="background:#bfb"
| 103 || July 31 || @ Cubs || 2–1 (10) || Al Holland (5–5) || Tim Stoddard (7–3) || Bill Campbell (1) || 30,175 || 56–47
|-

|- style="background:#fbb"
| 104 || August 1 || @ Cubs || 4–5 || Lee Smith (6–4) || Al Holland (5–6) || None || 32,900 || 56–48
|- style="background:#bfb"
| 105 || August 2 || @ Cardinals || 3–2 || Shane Rawley (6–6) || Danny Cox (5–9) || Al Holland (23) || 23,961 || 57–48
|- style="background:#fbb"
| 106 || August 3 || @ Cardinals || 3–4 || Ricky Horton (6–1) || Jerry Koosman (12–8) || Bruce Sutter (28) || 26,771 || 57–49
|- style="background:#fbb"
| 107 || August 4 || @ Cardinals || 2–3 || Dave LaPoint (8–9) || Larry Andersen (1–2) || Bruce Sutter (29) || 38,256 || 57–50
|- style="background:#bfb"
| 108 || August 5 || @ Cardinals || 6–3 || Bill Campbell (4–3) || Jeff Lahti (3–2) || Al Holland (24) || 42,114 || 58–50
|- style="background:#bfb"
| 109 || August 6 || @ Expos || 4–1 || Steve Carlton (10–5) || Charlie Lea (14–7) || None || 32,349 || 59–50
|- style="background:#bfb"
| 110 || August 7 (1) || @ Expos || 6–2 || Shane Rawley (7–6) || Bryn Smith (9–10) || Al Holland (25) || see 2nd game || 60–50
|- style="background:#fbb"
| 111 || August 7 (2) || @ Expos || 2–3 || Jeff Reardon (5–4) || Bill Campbell (4–4) || None || 39,271 || 60–51
|- style="background:#fbb"
| 112 || August 8 || @ Expos || 1–3 || Bill Gullickson (7–7) || Jerry Koosman (12–9) || Jeff Reardon (15) || 25,244 || 60–52
|- style="background:#bfb"
| 113 || August 9 || Cardinals || 2–1 (13) || Bill Campbell (5–4) || Dave Rucker (1–2) || None || 27,676 || 61–52
|- style="background:#fbb"
| 114 || August 10 || Cardinals || 0–3 (10) || Bruce Sutter (4–3) || Larry Andersen (1–3) || None || 25,824 || 61–53
|- style="background:#bfb"
| 115 || August 11 || Cardinals || 6–1 || Steve Carlton (11–5) || Joaquín Andújar (15–11) || None || 30,413 || 62–53
|- style="background:#bbb"
| – || August 12 || Cardinals || colspan=6 | Postponed (rain); Makeup: September 12 as a traditional double-header
|- style="background:#fbb"
| 116 || August 14 || @ Padres || 2–3 || Eric Show (12–7) || Jerry Koosman (12–10) || Craig Lefferts (8) || 23,799 || 62–54
|- style="background:#fbb"
| 117 || August 15 || @ Padres || 3–4 || Rich Gossage (7–4) || Al Holland (5–7) || None || 21,078 || 62–55
|- style="background:#bfb"
| 118 || August 16 || @ Padres || 8–3 || John Denny (5–3) || Andy Hawkins (7–5) || None || 23,125 || 63–55
|- style="background:#fbb"
| 119 || August 17 || @ Dodgers || 1–2 || Rick Honeycutt (10–7) || Steve Carlton (11–6) || Ken Howell (3) || 43,175 || 63–56
|- style="background:#bfb"
| 120 || August 18 || @ Dodgers || 6–5 || Jerry Koosman (13–10) || Ken Howell (2–3) || Al Holland (26) || 45,619 || 64–56
|- style="background:#bfb"
| 121 || August 19 || @ Dodgers || 6–3 || Shane Rawley (8–6) || Bob Welch (10–12) || None || 33,015 || 65–56
|- style="background:#bfb"
| 122 || August 20 || @ Giants || 6–4 || John Denny (6–3) || Mark Calvert (2–4) || Al Holland (27) || 7,970 || 66–56
|- style="background:#bfb"
| 123 || August 21 || @ Giants || 12–5 || Kevin Gross (7–5) || Frank Williams (6–2) || None || 5,560 || 67–56
|- style="background:#fbb"
| 124 || August 22 || @ Giants || 5–7 || Mark Davis (4–15) || Al Holland (5–8) || Gary Lavelle (9) || 8,053 || 67–57
|- style="background:#bfb"
| 125 || August 24 || Dodgers || 6–5 (10) || Kevin Gross (8–5) || Jerry Reuss (2–6) || None || 35,541 || 68–57
|- style="background:#fbb"
| 126 || August 25 || Dodgers || 4–7 || Bob Welch (11–12) || John Denny (6–4) || Ken Howell (4) || 30,253 || 68–58
|- style="background:#bfb"
| 127 || August 26 || Dodgers || 10–8 || Bill Campbell (6–4) || Burt Hooton (1–4) || Larry Andersen (4) || 33,255 || 69–58
|- style="background:#bfb"
| 128 || August 27 || Padres || 9–1 || Jerry Koosman (14–10) || Tim Lollar (10–11) || None || 26,302 || 70–58
|- style="background:#bfb"
| 129 || August 28 || Padres || 11–8 || Shane Rawley (9–6) || Andy Hawkins (7–7) || Al Holland (28) || 25,679 || 71–58
|- style="background:#fbb"
| 130 || August 29 || Padres || 0–2 || Mark Thurmond (11–7) || John Denny (6–5) || None || 25,131 || 71–59
|- style="background:#fbb"
| 131 || August 30 (1) || Giants || 5–6 || Bob Lacey (1–2) || Al Holland (5–9) || Greg Minton (16) || see 2nd game || 71–60
|- style="background:#bfb"
| 132 || August 30 (2) || Giants || 6–5 || Larry Andersen (2–3) || Mark Davis (4–16) || None || 36,354 || 72–60
|- style="background:#fbb"
| 133 || August 31 || Giants || 5–6 || Bill Laskey (7–11) || Jerry Koosman (14–11) || Mike Krukow (1) || 21,530 || 72–61
|-

|- style="background:#fbb"
| 134 || September 1 || Giants || 2–7 || Atlee Hammaker (2–0) || Charles Hudson (8–10) || Mark Grant (1) || 20,528 || 72–62
|- style="background:#bfb"
| 135 || September 2 || Giants || 8–3 || Shane Rawley (10–6) || Jeff Robinson (7–14) || None || 20,529 || 73–62
|- style="background:#fbb"
| 136 || September 3 || Cubs || 3–4 (12) || George Frazier (7–4) || Renie Martin (1–2) || Lee Smith (29) || 28,162 || 73–63
|- style="background:#fbb"
| 137 || September 4 || Cubs || 2–7 || Scott Sanderson (7–4) || Steve Carlton (11–7) || None || 25,054 || 73–64
|- style="background:#fbb"
| 138 || September 5 || @ Cardinals || 5–6 || Dave Rucker (2–3) || Al Holland (5–10) || None || 13,171 || 73–65
|- style="background:#fbb"
| 139 || September 6 || @ Cardinals || 5–6 || Bob Forsch (2–4) || Bill Campbell (6–5) || Bruce Sutter (39) || 14,524 || 73–66
|- style="background:#fbb"
| 140 || September 7 || @ Expos || 1–7 || Bryn Smith (11–11) || Shane Rawley (10–7) || None || 15,182 || 73–67
|- style="background:#fbb"
| 141 || September 8 || @ Expos || 0–4 || Steve Rogers (6–13) || John Denny (6–6) || None || 18,140 || 73–68
|- style="background:#bfb"
| 142 || September 9 || @ Expos || 6–5 (11) || Larry Andersen (3–3) || Joe Hesketh (1–1) || Kevin Gross (1) || 31,348 || 74–68
|- style="background:#fbb"
| 143 || September 10 || @ Cubs || 2–3 || Tim Stoddard (9–5) || Jerry Koosman (14–12) || Lee Smith (31) || 26,083 || 74–69
|- style="background:#bfb"
| 144 || September 11 || @ Cubs || 6–3 || Charles Hudson (9–10) || Lee Smith (9–6) || Al Holland (29) || 28,964 || 75–69
|- style="background:#bfb"
| 145 || September 12 (1) || Cardinals || 3–1 || Shane Rawley (11–7) || Kurt Kepshire (4–5) || None || see 2nd game || 76–69
|- style="background:#bfb"
| 146 || September 12 (2) || Cardinals || 6–5 || Tug McGraw (2–0) || Bruce Sutter (5–5) || None || 18,811 || 77–69
|- style="background:#bfb"
| 147 || September 13 || Cardinals || 10–2 || John Denny (7–6) || Joaquín Andújar (19–12) || None || 16,787 || 78–69
|- style="background:#bfb"
| 148 || September 14 || Expos || 9–5 || Steve Carlton (12–7) || Steve Rogers (6–14) || None || 18,194 || 79–69
|- style="background:#fbb"
| 149 || September 15 || Expos || 3–4 || Bill Gullickson (11–7) || Jerry Koosman (14–13) || Bob James (9) || 20,831 || 79–70
|- style="background:#fbb"
| 150 || September 16 || Expos || 4–8 || Jeff Reardon (6–7) || Renie Martin (1–3) || Bob James (10) || 26,273 || 79–71
|- style="background:#bfb"
| 151 || September 17 || Mets || 2–1 || Shane Rawley (12–7) || Dwight Gooden (16–9) || None || 20,483 || 80–71
|- style="background:#fbb"
| 152 || September 18 || Mets || 5–8 || Tom Gorman (5–0) || Larry Andersen (3–4) || Jesse Orosco (30) || 18,765 || 80–72
|- style="background:#bfb"
| 153 || September 19 || Mets || 13–5 || Steve Carlton (13–7) || Ron Darling (12–8) || None || 19,142 || 81–72
|- style="background:#fbb"
| 154 || September 21 || @ Pirates || 1–5 || Rod Scurry (5–6) || Jerry Koosman (14–14) || None || 4,940 || 81–73
|- style="background:#fbb"
| 155 || September 22 || @ Pirates || 1–2 (12) || Don Robinson (5–6) || Larry Andersen (3–5) || None || 6,927 || 81–74
|- style="background:#fbb"
| 156 || September 23 || @ Pirates || 2–4 || John Tudor (11–11) || Shane Rawley (12–8) || John Candelaria (2) || 11,249 || 81–75
|- style="background:#fbb"
| 157 || September 24 || @ Mets || 5–7 || Jesse Orosco (10–6) || Larry Andersen (3–6) || Brent Gaff (1) || 11,071 || 81–76
|- style="background:#fbb"
| 158 || September 25 || @ Mets || 4–6 || Ed Lynch (9–8) || Larry Andersen (3–7) || None || 13,812 || 81–77
|- style="background:#fbb"
| 159 || September 26 || @ Mets || 1–7 || Sid Fernandez (6–6) || Jerry Koosman (14–15) || None || 5,251 || 81–78
|- style="background:#bbb"
| – || September 28 || Pirates || colspan=6 | Postponed (rain); Makeup: September 30 as a traditional double-header
|- style="background:#fbb"
| 160 || September 29 || Pirates || 0–4 || Rick Rhoden (14–9) || Charles Hudson (9–11) || None || 27,493 || 81–79
|- style="background:#fbb"
| 161 || September 30 (1) || Pirates || 0–2 || John Tudor (12–11) || John Denny (7–7) || Don Robinson (10) || see 2nd game || 81–80
|- style="background:#fbb"
| 162 || September 30 (2) || Pirates || 2–7 || Larry McWilliams (12–11) || Shane Rawley (12–9) || None || 17,292 || 81–81
|-

Roster

Player stats

Batting

Starters by position 
Note: Pos = Position; G = Games played; AB = At bats; H = Hits; Avg. = Batting average; HR = Home runs; RBI = Runs batted in

Other batters 
Note: G = Games played; AB = At bats; H = Hits; Avg. = Batting average; HR = Home runs; RBI = Runs batted in

Pitching

Starting pitchers 
Note: G = Games pitched; IP = Innings pitched; W = Wins; L = Losses; ERA = Earned run average; SO = Strikeouts

Other pitchers 
Note: G = Games pitched; IP = Innings pitched; W = Wins; L = Losses; ERA = Earned run average; SO = Strikeouts

Relief pitchers 
Note: G = Games pitched; W = Wins; L = Losses; SV = Saves; ERA = Earned run average; SO = Strikeouts

Awards and honors
 Juan Samuel, National League record (since broken), Most Stolen Bases by a rookie

Farm system

Notes

References 
1984 Philadelphia Phillies season at Baseball Reference

Philadelphia Phillies seasons
Philadelphia Phillies season
Philadelphia